Beyond the Law is a 1918 American silent film directed by Theodore Marston. It was based on a serial story of the same name, authored by Emmett Dalton, the lone surviving brother of the Dalton Gang, who appears in the film as himself and two of his deceased brothers.

Background
Emmett Dalton wrote a serial story recounting "the exploits he and his brother outlaws perpetrated." Titled Beyond the Law, it was published in The Wide World Magazine, a London monthly, starting in May 1918. The same month, Dalton moved to Gastonia, North Carolina, as did the company he was the general manager of, the Southern Feature Film Corporation. The company published a half-page notice in the local paper, announcing their intention to make Beyond the Law into a movie, which it described as "a beautiful, historical, romantic story written around the lives of the Dalton Boys." A newspaper article in mid-July reported that production of the film was due to begin later that month requiring at least 30 people, and expected to last four or five weeks. An article the following week reported that Dalton was going to New York City to film interior scenes at the Famous Players Studio, with outdoor scenes to be filmed later in Bat Cave, North Carolina, and at Pawnee Bill Ranch in Oklahoma. References to the finished film, "a special six-reel feature", began to appear in early December. Showings of the film were reported by various newspapers starting in early 1919, including in Washington, D.C.; Newport News, Virginia; and Dalton's home city at the time, Gastonia. These reports also highlighted that Dalton personally attended screenings of the movie and would "lecture" at each performance.

Cast
 Emmett Dalton	as himself, Bob Dalton, and Frank Dalton
 Harris Gordon	as the young Emmett Dalton
 Ida Pardee as Mother Dalton
 William R. Dunn as Grat Dalton
 Mabel Bardine as Eugenia Moore
 Jack O'Loughlin as William McElhanie
 Dick Clark as Charles Bryant
 Virginia Lee as Ruth Lane
 Bobby Connelly
Source:

References

Further reading

External links
 

1918 films
1910s English-language films
American black-and-white films
Silent American Western (genre) films
1918 Western (genre) films
Films directed by Theodore Marston
1910s American films